The RA Photo Club is located in Ottawa, and is the city's largest photo club, with over 300 members. It meets weekly at its location in the RA Centre from September to May, hosting speakers and monthly competitions. The RA Photo Club has many special interest groups, including Nature, Audio-Visual, Portrait, Figure and Glamour, Digital, Photo Critique and Urban. The club is a member of the Canadian Association for Photographic Art, a national organization promoting and encouraging the photographic arts in Canada.

The club has exhibited at many area venues including the National Press Club (located in the National Press Building), and partners with local charities to provide photographic services.
In 2006, these included the Tulip Festival (Ottawa), Canada Dance Festival, Ottawa Chamber Music Festival, Ottawa Bluesfest, Ottawa Dragon Boat Race Festival and Hope Volleyball. The festival partnerships resulted in several media uses of the photographs, including a spread by the Ottawa Citizen.

Partnering with festivals is now limited to the Ottawa Chamber Music Festival.

Competitions and Rank 

Photographic competitions are run throughout the year, approximately monthly. These include an annual regional inter-club competition and the Bruce Wilson Memorial Trophy (which features entries of a set of five related black-and-white prints). Special interest groups run competitions or showcases as well, including the Nature Fall Challenge and the Urban Spring Creative Challenge.

Members acquire rank by consistently succeeding in the club competitions. Ranks range from Junior through Intermediate to Senior to Master. In the entire history of the club, there have only been two members that have attained the rank of Master. Jim Sutton and Yannis Souris.

History 

The RA Photo Club was founded in 1939 as the "RA Camera Club", its first chairperson being Doug White of the National Film Board of Canada and met at 30 Rideau St. near the Government Conference Centre (then Union Station). In 1951 color slides were introduced and prints began to be exhibited in local theatres and department stores. The club moved to its current location at the RA Centre in 1962.

In 1970, Special interest focus groups of the club began with a Nature group in 1970.

Over the years the club has added facilities, including a darkroom in 1951, a portrait studio in 1955, audio-visual capability in 1978 and a digital lab in 2002. Recorded historical membership levels include: 50 in 1958, 90 in 1965, 200 in 1999 and over 250 in 2006.

Recent Activity 
2007 - Peter Juranka was recently a featured artist in Ottawa Life Magazine.

2007 - Three club members, Bill Young, Peter Juranka and Mike (Binary Rhyme) Heffernan scored honorable mentions in the Canadian Association for Photographic Art's Canadian national digital photography competition.

2006 - One of its members, Henry Fernando, was a top three finalist in a worldwide Popular Photography Magazine "Photographer of the Year 2006 " competition.

2006 - In a strange twist, the Urban Group's Press Release (regarding partnership with local Festivals) has been included in a text on effective media communications, offered by The Guild of Master Craftsmen.

External links
 RA Photo Club
 Canadian Association for Photographic Art
 Ottawa Life Magazine
 Popular Photography Photographer of the Year Winner
 The Guild of Master Craftsmen

Organizations based in Ottawa
Canadian photography organizations